Dobrun is a commune in Olt County, Oltenia, Romania. It is composed of five villages: Chilii, Dobrun, Roșienii Mari, Roșienii Mici, and Ulmet. It also included Bobu and Osica de Jos villages until 2004, when these split off to form Osica de Jos commune.

References

Communes in Olt County
Localities in Oltenia